French Americans are U.S. citizens or nationals of French descent and heritage. The majority of Franco-American families did not arrive directly from France, but rather settled French territories in the New World (primarily in the 17th and 18th centuries) before moving or being forced to move to the United States later on (see Quebec diaspora and Great Upheaval). Also, the largest French territory in North America was sold to the U.S., absorbing their French citizens (see Louisiana Purchase). About thirteen million U.S. residents are of French descent, and about 1.5 million of them speak the French language at home. Being isolated, mixed with different cultures, or ignored, the French-Americans developed particular cultures that reflect varying degrees of adaptation of their environments. This gave birth to streams of French-Americans like the Acadians, the Cajuns (an Anglicization of the autonym Cadien, from the French word for Acadian, Acadien), Louisiana Créoles and many others.

The following is a list of notable French Americans by occupation, including both original immigrants who obtained American citizenship and their American descendants.

To be included in this list, the person must have a Wikipedia article showing they are French American or must have references showing they are French American and are notable.

Business

General

 Tom Bergeron (born 1955), Emmy Award-nominated American television personality
 John Vernou Bouvier III (1891–1957), Wall Street stockbroker and father of U.S. First Lady Jacqueline Lee Bouvier
 Roger E Brunschwig, highly decorated world wars hero, activist, businessman 
 Warren Buffett, of French Huguenot ancestry and among the top wealthiest men in the world
 François Castaing, 27-year veteran automotive executive
 Clyde Cessna, 
 Louis Chevrolet, co-founder with William C. Durant of the Chevrolet Motor Car Company
 Yvon Chouinard, rock climber, environmentalist and outdoor industry businessman
 Ellen DeGeneres, TV personality and businesswoman
 John de Menil, President of Schlumberger North America
 Georges Doriot (1899–1988), one of the first American venture capitalists
 William C. Durant, founder of General Motors; a co-founder with Louis Chevrolet of the Chevrolet Motor Car Company
 Jean-Louis Gassée (born 1944), founder of Be Inc.
 King Camp Gillette, founder of the Gillette Safety Razor Company
 Stephen Girard (1750–1831), banker and tradesman from Bordeaux
 Augustus D. Juilliard (1836–1919), businessman whose philanthropy built the renowned conservatory of dance, music, and theater in New York City that bears his name
 Philippe Kahn (born 1952), mathematician and entrepreneur known as the inventor of the camera phone, a pioneer in the wireless industry, and the founder of Borland
 Joseph LaCombe, retired American businessman and owner of Joseph LaCombe Stable Inc., a thoroughbred horse racing stable
 Thomas W. Lamont, banker
 Robert LeFevre (1911–1986), libertarian businessman and radio personality
 Gérard Louis-Dreyfus, French businessman and father of actress Julia Louis-Dreyfus
 Étienne Lucier, fur trader from French Prairie
 André Meyer (1898–1979), Wall Street investment banker
 Pierre Omidyar (born 1967), French-born Iranian, founder of eBay
 Frank Perdue & Associates, the Perdue family is of French Huguenot ancestry, and can be traced back to Anjou, France; the family created the Perdue Chicken Company
 Ross Perot (1930–2019), entrepreneur, philanthropist and candidate for the Presidency of the United States
 Alexis F. du Pont (1879–1948), member of the American du Pont family and helped found St. Andrew's School in Middletown, Delaware; father of Alexis Felix du Pont, Jr.; founder of U.S. Airways
 Alexis Felix du Pont, Jr. (1905–1996), American aviation pioneer, soldier, philanthropist, and a member of the prominent Du Pont family
 Eleuthère Irénée du Pont de Nemours, patriarch of a successful American business family; chemical industry
 Richard Chichester du Pont (1911–1943), American businessman and an aviation and glider pioneer
 Baroness Micaela Almonester de Pontalba, New Orleans-born businesswoman; French mother
 Felix Rohatyn (1928–2019), businessman, investment banker, served in public service as an ambassador
 Jacques Telesphore Roman (1800–1848), businessman
 Chloë Sevigny (born 1974), actress with French-Canadian ancestry
 Paul Tulane (1801–1887), businessman and philanthropist, Tulane University named in his honor

Entertainment

Actors
 Renée Adorée, French-born American actress
 Jessica Alba, actress; mother is of partial French-Canadian ancestry
 Cliff Arquette(1905–1974), American actor was of part French-Canadian descent, and his family's surname was originally "Arcouet"
 Lewis Arquette (1935–2001), American actor, was French-Canadian descent
 Patricia Arquette (born 1968), American actress, was French-Canadian descent
 Alexis Arquette (July 28, 1969 – September 11, 2016), was an American actress, cabaret performer, underground cartoonist, and activist. Alexis was a French-Canadian descent
 René Auberjonois (1940–2019), Tony Award-winner, American character actor (and grandson of the painter), best known for his early 1980s role as Clayton Endicott III on the television show Benson and his role as Odo on Star Trek: Deep Space Nine
 Tina Aumont, California-born actress; father was an immigrant from France
 Alec Baldwin, actor, one of the four brothers; mother was of part French-Canadian ancestry
 Daniel Baldwin, actor, one of the four brothers; mother was of part French-Canadian ancestry
 Stephen Baldwin, actor, one of the four brothers; mother was of part French-Canadian ancestry
 William Baldwin, actor, one of the four brothers; mother was of part French-Canadian ancestry
 Lucille Ball (1911–1989), actress; mother was of partial French heritage
 Adrienne Barbeau (born 1945), 1980s B-movie actress; father was of part French-Canadian ancestry
 Jean-Marc Barr, French-American film actor and director
 Earl W. Bascom (1906–1995), cowboy actor and artist, descendant of Nicolas Martiau 
 Hugh Beaumont, actor with large filmography; father was of French ancestry
 Pierre Bellocq, French-American artist and horse racing cartoonist
 Melissa Benoist, American actress, of partial French descent through paternal great-grandfather
 Marcheline Bertrand, actress of half French-Canadian ancestry, mother of actress Angelina Jolie
 Jessica Biel (born 1982), American actress with distant French roots
 JB Blanc (born 1969), actor; father of French descent
 Cate Blanchett, (actress)
 Joan Blondell (1906–1979), American actress; father Eddie was of French descent
 Caprice Bourret (born 1971), French American actress and model
 Charles Boyer (1899–1978), film actor, immigrant from France
 Elizabeth Bracco, actress with French and Italian ancestry
 Lorraine Bracco, actress with French and Italian ancestry
 Jules Brulatour, pioneering figure in American silent cinema
 Ellen Bry, actress best-known for her work on the NBC medical drama series St. Elsewhere
 Mary Cadorette, former American actress
 Dove Cameron, American actor of French descent
 Dean Cain, American actor, of part French descent
 Trishelle Cannatella (born 1979), American actress, model; of Cajun ancestry

 Leslie Caron (born 1931), film actress and dancer; born in France
 Charisma Carpenter (born 1970), American actress, of part French descent
 Jim Carrey, Canadian-American actor; father was of French-Canadian ancestry and family surname was Anglicization of Carré
 Lacey Chabert (born 1982), actress, father of mostly Cajun/French descent
 Loan Chabanol (born 1982), actress
 Timothée Chalamet (born 1995), French-American actor; born to a French father, of French and British descent, and an American Jewish mother, holds both passports
 Lon Chaney, Sr., silent film actor, of part French descent
 Lon Chaney, Jr., actor and son of Lon Chaney, Sr.; of part French descent
 David Charvet, French-born American actor and singer, husband of Brooke Burke
 Lilyan Chauvin, French-born actress
 Robert Clary (1926–2022) actor, published author, and lecturer
 Claudette Colbert, French-born actress
 Bud Cort (born 1948), actor, of partial French descent
 Phil Cousineau, author, screenwriter, and documentary filmmaker
 Joan Crawford, actress, her father was of partial French Huguenot ancestry
 Billy Crudup, actor
 Willem Dafoe, actor, father was of partial French descent
 Lili Damita, French-born actress
 Bette Davis, film actress, born in Lowell, Massachusetts; father was of English descent and mother was of French-Canadian descent
 Robert De Niro, one of the most acclaimed actors of all time; two-time Academy Award winner; mother had small amount of French ancestry
 Ellen DeGeneres, actress, talk-show host; father was of part French descent
 Johnny Depp (born 1963), actor; He is descended from a French Huguenot immigrant (Pierre Dieppe, who settled in Virginia around 1700)
 Lily-Rose Depp, French-born American actress and model. She is the daughter of American actor, producer, and musician Johnny Depp and French singer, actress, and model Vanessa Paradis.

 Julie Delpy (born 1969), actress, immigrant from France
 Emilie de Ravin (born 1981), actress; naturalized American citizen
 Emily Deschanel, actress and daughter of cinematographer Caleb Deschanel, of partial French descent
 Zooey Deschanel, actress and daughter of cinematographer Caleb Deschanel, of partial French descent
 Arielle Dombasle (born 1958), singer and actress working primarily in the cinema of France
 Brad Dourif (born 1950), actor; paternal grandparents were immigrants from France
 Fiona Dourif (born 1981), American actress of part French ancestry, daughter of Brad Dourif
 Joanne Dru, actress; sister of actor and TV game show host Peter Marshall
 Val Dufour, actor, known for his role of Andre Lazar on The Edge of Night
 Nicole duFresne (1977–2005), playwright and actress
 Josh Duhamel (born 1972), actor, father is of partial French-Canadian ancestry
 Tiffany Dupont (born 1981), French American actress known for the film One Night With the King
 James Duval, actor, known for his roles as Frank in Donnie Darko and as Singh in Go; both parents are of partial French ancestry
 Clea DuVall, actress, father is of part French descent
 Robert Duvall, of distant French paternal ancestry
 Mireille Enos, actress; mother is French
 Jon Favreau, actor, director, screenwriter, voice artist, and comedian; father is of partial French-Canadian ancestry
 Robert Florey (1900–1979), actor, director, screenwriter
 Jorja Fox, actress, CSI: Crime Scene Investigation, mother is of French-Canadian and Belgian ancestry
 Brendan Fraser, actor 
 Eva Le Gallienne, actress
 Brittny Gastineau (born 1983), American actress, and model; daughter of former NFL player Mark Gastineau and Lisa Gastineau
 Richard Gautier, actor
 Cam Gigandet, actor, known for Never Back Down and Red Sky
 Robert Goulet (1933–2007), actor/singer
 Adrian Grenier, actor, mother has small amount of French ancestry
 Alice Guy-Blaché, pioneer filmmaker; first female director in the motion picture industry
 Anne Hathaway (born 1982), film actress; of mostly Irish and French ancestry
 Kyle Hebert, voice actor
 Frances Heflin, actress, of partial French descent
 Van Heflin, actor, of partial French descent
 Gillian Jacobs, actress, known for her role on the NBC sitcom Community; of part French descent
 Celina Jade, actress, singer and martial artist
 Angelina Jolie (born 1975), actress, maternal grandfather was of French-Canadian descent
 Victoria Justice (born 1993), father is of part French descent
 Minka Kelly (born 1980), American actress; known for role of Lyla Garrity on NBC's Friday Night Lights; biological father is aerosmith guitarist Rick Dufay, born in France, to American parents
 Rod La Rocque (1898–1969), film actor of French Canadian descent
 Shia LaBeouf (born 1986), actor, Cajun (French) father
 Art LaFleur (born 1943) American actor
 Christopher Lambert (born 1957), actor
 Cynthia Lamontagne, actress
 Dorothy Lamour (1914–1996), film actress, mother was of French Cajun ancestry
 John Larroquette, Emmy Award-winning film and television actor
 Brie Larson, (born 1989), film actress. Larson was born Brianne Sidonie Desaulniers. Her father is French Canadian, and in her childhood, Larson spoke French as her first language
 Eva LaRue (born 1966), actress best known for portraying Natalia Boa Vista on CSI: Miami; was on a soap opera for many years; ovarian cancer spokesperson
 Lash LaRue (1917–1996), actor
 Taylor Lautner (born 1992), actor, martial artist, of partial French descent
 Sabrina Le Beauf (born 1958), actress, French Creole, known for playing Sandra on The Cosby Show
 Eva Le Gallienne, well-known actress, producer, and director, during the first half of the 20th century
 Christian LeBlanc (born 1958), two-time Emmy Award-winning American actor
 Matt LeBlanc (born 1967), American actor, known as Joey Tribbiani on the show Friends; father was of French-Canadian heritage
 Adam LeFevre, actor, Taxi, of partial French descent  
 Harry Lennix, actor, Suspect Zero, 24, of partial French descent
 Jennifer LeRoy, adult film actress, actress and model
 Hal LeSueur, actor and brother of Joan Crawford; father is of partial French Huguenot ancestry
Jared Leto, actor and frontman of Thirty Seconds to Mars, of French Cajun descent
 Matthew Libatíque  is an American cinematographer who is known for his work on the films Pi (1998), Requiem for a Dream (2000), The Fountain (2006), Black Swan (2010).
 Jon Lormer, French-American actor
 Julia Louis-Dreyfus, daughter of French-Jewish businessman Gérard Louis-Dreyfus; known for her roles in the series Seinfeld and The New Adventures of Old Christine
 Brook Mahealani Lee (born 1971), Eurasian model; former miss Hawaii, Miss USA, and Miss Universe 1997
 J. P. Manoux, Marquant actor, Phil of the Future, Angel, Smallville, Scrubs, Charmed, and Crossing Jordan
 Peter Marshall, best known as the original host of the TV game show Hollywood Squares; brother of actress Joanne Dru
 Mike Marshall, French-American actor; son of director William Marshall and half-brother of Tonie Marshall
 Tonie Marshall, French-American actress; son of director William Marshall and half-sister of Mike Marshall
 Rosita Marstini (1887–1948), dancer, stage personality, silent and sound film actress from Nancy, France
 Charles Martinet (1955), actor best known as the voice of Mario and Luigi in the Super Mario franchise.
 The Marx Brothers, whose father Sam Marx was born in France
 Rose McGowan (born 1973), American actress best known for Charmed; of Irish paternal and French maternal ancestry
 Meiling Melançon, actress
 Christopher Meloni (born 1961), American actor, mother is of French-Canadian heritage
 Adolphe Menjou (1890–1963), film actor, especially from the 1920s–1940s
 Jesse Metcalfe (1978), played John Rowland in Desperate Housewives; father is of partial French ancestry
 Wentworth Miller, mother has distant French ancestry
 Yvette Mimieux (1942-2022), American actress, of French and Mexican ancestry
 Nathan Fillion (born 1970), actor 
 Madison Pettis (born 1998), American actress of French, Irish, Italian, and African-American ancestry
 Victor Pépin, circus master with the Circus of Pépin and Breschard
 Pauley Perrette, (born 1969), American actress
 Ryan Phillippe, of part French descent 
 Tyrone Power, actor, mother was of part French-Canadian descent, father was of partial French Huguenot ancestry
 Dennis William Quaid (born 1954), American film actor. Quaid has English, Irish, Scots-Irish, and Cajun (French) ancestry.
 Randy Randall Rudy Quaid (born 1950), American film actor. Quaid has English, Irish, Scots-Irish, and Cajun (French) ancestry.
 Maggie Quigley (born 1979), Euro-Asian American actress and former fashion model, known for Mission Impossible III and Balls of Fury, father of part French-Canadian descent
 Mickey Rourke, actor, mother of part French descent
 Brandon Routh, actor, of partial French heritage
 Carol Roux, actress
 Kiele Sanchez (born 1977), actress, mother of French descent
 Reni Santoni, film, television and voice actor
 April Scott (born 1977), American actress of French, Native American, and Spanish ancestry
 Michael Sinterniklaas (born 1972), voice actor
 Tom Sizemore (born 1961), actor of maternal part French ancestry
 Leelee Sobieski (born 1983), film actress, father is an immigrant from France, who is of Polish and Swiss descent
 Shannyn Sossamon (born 1978), born in Honolulu, Hawaii, of French, Hawaiian, Dutch, English, Irish, Filipino, and German descent
 Sylvester Stallone (born 1946), actor and film producer; mother is half French; maternal grandmother is from Brest
 Stéphanie Szostak (born 1975), actress
 Charlize Theron (born 1975), born in South Africa, now an American actress of French Huguenot, Dutch, and German descent
 Justin Theroux, actor, screenwriter and director, father is of French-Canadian and Italian heritage
 Franchot Tone, Hollywood actor, of partial French descent
 Beth Toussaint, actress, Red Eye
 Luis van Rooten (1906–1973), actor
 Michael Vartan, actor, born in France (not of French descent)
 Hervé Villechaize (1943–1973), French American actor born to Paris and immigrant from France
 Mari Blanchard, actress
 Tessa Gräfin von Walderdorff (b. 1994), actress of French, Swiss, Dutch and German ancestry
 Rudolph Valentino (1895–1926), his mother was French from Lure, Haute-Saône

Artists
 Earl W. Bascom (1906–1995), artist and sculptor, "Cowboy of Cowboy Artists"
 Tom Bergeron, TV host, Emmy Award-nominated
 Louise Bourgeois (1911–2010), abstract expressionist artist; born in Paris, married an American
 Brooke Burke (born 1971), television personality and model, known for hosting Wild On! (1999–2002); of French, Irish, Jewish, and Portuguese ancestry
 Isabelle Collin Dufresne (1935–2014), artist, author, and former colleague of Andy Warhol
 Katie Couric, TV personality, most of her ancestry is French
 Ellen DeGeneres, TV personality, father is of French Cajun ancestry
 Leah Dizon (born 1986), actress, model, and singer; of French, and Asian (Filipino-Chinese) ancestry
 Angela Dufresne, artist based in Brooklyn, New York
 Edgar de Evia, Mexican-born photographer and son of French pianist Pauline Joutard
 Sean Flynn, photographer whose death in Cambodia remains a mystery; son of actress Lili Damita and actor Errol Flynn 
 Melody Gardot (born 1985), jazz singer from Philadelphia
 Peter Grain (1785–1857), painter, architect and panoramist
 Van Heflin
 Gaston Lachaise (1882–1935), sculptor
 Danielle Lacourse (born 1986), French American Miss USA runner-up
 Bonnie Jill Laflin (born 1976), model and actress; of French descent
 Don LaFontaine, voiceover artist; recorded more than 5,000 film trailers and hundreds of thousands of television advertisements, network promotions, and video game trailers; his nicknames include "Thunder Throat" and "The Voice of God"
 Allie LaForce (born 1988), beauty queen from Vermilion, Ohio; Miss Teen USA 2005
 Ali Landry, actress, model
 Brook Mahealani Lee (born 1971), Miss USA and Miss Hawaii USA prior to winning the Miss Universe 1997 pageant; of mixed Korean, Portuguese, French, Hawaiian and Chinese ancestry
 Paul de Longpré, flower painter
 Madonna (born 1958), international singer; mother is of French-Canadian descent
 Josie Maran (born 1978), American supermodel of partial French ancestry
 Michelle Maylene (born 1987), pornographic actress; of Filipino, and French ancestry
 Maria McBane (born 1946), model and actress, Playboy Playmate of the Month May 1965
 Linda Moon, Playboy magazine Playmate of the Month October 1966
 Frederic Remington (1861–1909), western artist and sculptor
 Bernard Renaud (Renot) (born 1935), French-born American artist, sculptor, illustrator and author
 René Ricard, artist, poet, and philosopher
 Jasmin St. Claire (born 1974), pornographic actress; of Italian, Russian, and French ancestry
 Patrick Tatopoulos, Greek-French-American production designer
 Tila Tequila (born 1981), model, singer, and actress; of 3/4 Vietnamese, and 1/4 French ancestry
 Stephanie Trudeau (born 1986), French American Miss Montana winner
 Henry Villierme (1928 - 2013), French American artist (Bay Area Figurative Movement)

Musicians
 Phil Anselmo (born 1968), heavy metal musician
 Sara Bareilles (born 1979), American singer, her first single was "Love Song"
 David Benoit (born 1953), American jazz pianist
 Jello Biafra, singer for 1970s punk band Dead Kennedys
 Brent Bourgeois (born 1958), American rock musician, songwriter, and producer
 Wellman Braud, jazz string bass player
 Colbie Caillat, young singer and daughter of Ken Caillat
 Lucien Cailliet (1897–1985), American composer, conductor, arranger and clarinetist
 Marcel Chagnon, American country music singer-songwriter
 Cher, American singer, actress
 Kurt Cobain (1967–1994), lead singer, guitarist, and songwriter for band Nirvana; His ancestry was mostly of French and Irish origin
 Amie Comeaux (1976–1997), country singer
 Alice Cooper (born 1947), American singer; has French Huguenot ancestry
 Joe Dassin (1938–1980), French-speaking musician
 Paul De Lisle, singer, Smash Mouth
 Gavin DeGraw (born 1977), American singer of French descent
 Marianne Dissard (born 1969), French-born singer
 Leah Dizon (born 1986), singer, model, actress of French and Asian ancestry
 Michael Doucet, singer, songwriter and founder of the Cajun band BeauSoleil
 Joe Duplantier (born 1976), singer and guitarist of the metal band Gojira
 Mario Duplantier (born 1981), drummer of the metal band Gojira
 Mary Gauthier, folk singer and songwriter
 George Girard, musician
 Ice-T, rapper, actor and vocalist of the heavy metal band Body Count of African-American and Creole descent
 Dan Ingram, Top 40 disc jockey with a forty-year career on radio stations such as WABC and WCBS-FM in New York City
 JoJo (born 1990), American pop/R&B singer-songwriter and actress
 Beyoncé Knowles (born 1981), American R&B singer-songwriter and actress; a French Creole of French and African-American and Native American descent
 Solange Knowles (born 1986), R&B singer; a French Creole of French and African-American and Native American descent
 Ray Lamontagne (born 1974), American Grammy Award-winning singer-songwriter
 Amel Larrieux (born 1973), American R&B/soul singer-songwriter
 Calixa Lavallée, lived in Rhode Island and served in the American Civil War as lieutenant
 Mylon LeFevre, gospel singer and writer
 Victoria Legrand, French-born lead singer and keyboardist of the dream pop duo Beach House
 Iry LeJeune, one of the best-selling and most popular musicians during 1940
 Braeden Lemasters, lead guitarist and singer of Wallows, of French Huguenot descent
 Paz Lenchantin, bass player part of the band A Perfect Circle
 J. B. Lenoir, Chicago blues guitarist, singer and songwriter
 Charles Martin Loeffler, French-born composer
 Madonna (born 1958), French-Canadian on her mother's side of the family
 W. A. Mathieu, composer, pianist, choir director, music teacher, and author
 Pierre Monteux (1875–1964), orchestra conductor
 Dave Mustaine, founder of heavy metal Band Megadeth; former member of Metallica
 Madeleine Peyroux, American jazz singer, songwriter, and guitarist
 Lily Pons (1898–1976), coloratura soprano
 Elvis Presley, American singer-songwriter and actor, often referred to as "the King of Rock and Roll", or simply "the King"
 Marc Rebillet, American musician, French father
 Zachary Richard,(born 1950), American cajun musician, singer-songwriter and poet
 Shandi Sinnamon, singer-songwriter
 Izzy Stradlin, American rock musician
 DeVante Swing, member of R&B group Jodeci
 Edgard Varèse, French-born composer
 Jaci Velasquez (born 1979), American singer, Grammy Award, and Dove Award winner of Mexican, French, and Spanish ancestry
 Maïa Vidal (b. 1988), singer-songwriter
 Rufus Wainwright (born 1973), singer-songwriter
 Clarence White (1944-1973), musician for The Byrds

Other entertainers
 Charlotte d'Amboise (b. 1964), American actress and dancer and daughter of Jacques d'Amboise
 Christopher d'Amboise (b. 1960), American dancer, choreographer, writer, and theatre director, son of Jacques d'Amboise
 Jacques d'Amboise (1934-2021), American ballet dancer and choreographer
 Kevyn Aucoin (1962-2002), make-up artist and photographer
 Anthony Bourdain, author and the "Chef-at-Large" of Brasserie Les Halles, based in New York City with locations in Miami, Florida, and Washington, D.C. and host of the Travel Channel's culinary and cultural adventure program Anthony Bourdain: No Reservations
 Joseph C. Brun (1907–1998), French-born American cinematographer
 Damien Chazelle, American director and screenwriter
 Steven Crowder, French-Canadian and American conservative political commentator on YouTube
 Vance DeGeneres, performer, producer, and writer of several television shows
 Caleb Deschanel, American cinematographer
 Lynsey DuFour, soap opera writer
 Virginie Amélie Avegno Gautreau (1859–1915), artist's model, also known as "Madame X"
 Paul Germain, animation screenwriter and producer
 Michael Goudeau, juggler and ex-circus clown; writer and executive producer for the Showtime series Bullshit!
 Marianne Gravatte, Playboy playmate
 Lloyd Jacquet, comic-book innovator
 Susan La Flesche Picotte (1865–1915), physician; 3/4 Native, 1/4 French
 Fredric Lean award-winning documentary filmmaker
 Ted LeFevre, theatrical set designer
 Monique Lhuillier (born 1971), fashion designer
 Yolanda "Tongolele" Montes, exotic dancer and actress of the Cinema of Mexico
 Jacqueline Kennedy Onassis (1929–1994), First Lady and wife of the late John F. Kennedy; maiden name is Bouvier and she is usually referred to by all three of her surnames together; father was of French descent
 Jean-Paul Poulain (died 2007), Maine Franco-American cabaret recording artist
 Carrie Prejean, model and beauty pageant contestant; father is of French descent
 Lee Radziwill (Caroline Lee Bouvier), daughter of stockbroker John Vernou Bouvier III and sister of former first lady Jacqueline Onassis
 Camille Rowe, model; father is French
 Oliver Stone, director
 Cyril Takayama, Japanese/French American illusionist
 Susette LaFlesche Tibbles (1854–1903), sister of Susan La Flesche, writer, and artist
 Garry Trudeau, cartoonist, best known for the Doonesbury comic strip
 Paul Verdier, stage director, actor, and playwright; had a number of guest parts on American television
 Jurgen Vsych, film director, screenwriter and author
 Ludwig Ahgren, online streamer and YouTuber; mother is French

Explorers
 Étienne de Veniard, Sieur de Bourgmont (1679–1734), French explorer who made the first maps and documentation of the Missouri and Platte rivers
 Jean Baptiste Baudreau II, the only man in American history executed by breaking wheel
 Jean-Baptiste Le Moyne de Bienville, founder of New Orleans, Biloxi, Natchez; co-founder of Mobile; served as colonial Governor of Louisiana (New France) for four terms, totaling 30 years
 Antoine de la Mothe Cadillac, founder of Detroit and one-time colonial governor of Louisiana (New France)
 Jean-Baptiste Charbonneau, born on the Lewis and Clark Expedition, depicted on a US$1 coin
 Toussaint Charbonneau, member of the Lewis and Clark Expedition
 François Chouteau (1797–1838), first white settlers of Kansas City, Missouri
 René Auguste Chouteau (1749–1829), trader with American Indians; founder of and influential figure in early St. Louis
 George Drouillard, translator on the Lewis and Clark Expedition
 Jean Baptiste Point du Sable (1745–1818), first permanent settler in Chicago, Illinois
 Marquis Duquesne (1700–1778), French Governor of New France; served from 1752 to 1755; best known for his role in the French and Indian War
 Peter Faneuil (1700–1743), colonial merchant and philanthropist who donated Faneuil Hall to Boston
 John C. Fremont (1813–1890), explorer with Kit Carson
 John Lewis Gervais, statesman and planter from South Carolina; formed delegate to the Continental Congress
 Joseph Gervais, pioneer settler and trapper in the Columbia District of the Hudson's Bay Company
 Antoine LeClaire, founder of Davenport, Iowa
 Pierre Antoine and Paul Mallet, early explorers and traders in the 18th century, in particular of the  Santa Fe Trail
 Alexander McGillivray (1750–1793), leader of the Creek Indians
 Henry Davis Minot, railroad executive
 John Bevins Moisant (1868–1910), aviator
 Etienne Provost (1785–1850), explorer of Utah Valley
 Paul Revere (1734/1735–1818), silversmith and a patriot in the American Revolution
 Daniel Roberdeau (1727–1795), merchant
 Charles Rochon, founder of modern-day Mobile, commemorated with a plaque at Fort Conde
 Ceran St. Vrain, (1802 - 1870), trader in Missouri, Louisiana and New Mexico, including on the Santa Fe Trail
 Jedediah Smith, (1799–1831), discovered South Pass of the Rocky Mountains, first American to reach California by land 
 William Sublette (1799–1845), explorer, fur trapper, mountain man
 Pedro Vial (1746 - 1814), French explorer who pioneered the Santa Fe Trail in the 18th century.

Law and politics

Governors and presidents
 Donald Trump  (born 1946) 45th president of the United states. He is a descendant of frenchs huguenots who fled to Netherlands after L'edit de Fontainebleau
 Armand Beauvais (1783–1843), Governor of Louisiana
 Joe Biden (born 1942), is an American politician and the 46th president of the United States. Joseph Sr.'s parents, Mary Elizabeth (née Robinette) and Joseph H. Biden (an oil businessman from Baltimore, Maryland) were of English, French, and Irish descent.
 Newton C. Blanchard (1849–1922), United States Representative, Senator, and Governor of Louisiana
 Kathleen Blanco, Governor of Louisiana
 Pierre Derbigny (1769–1829), Governor of Louisiana
 Jacques Dupre, Louisiana state representative, state senator and Governor of Louisiana
 William Pope Duval (1784–1854), first governor of Florida
 Edwin Edwards (1927–2021), Louisiana governor for four terms
 Paul Octave Hébert (1818–1880), Governor of Louisiana from 1853 to 1856 and a general in the Confederate Army
 John Jay, second governor of New York and first Chief Justice of the United States
 Robert M. La Follette, Governor of Wisconsin and progressive reformer
 Paul Laxalt, Governor of Nevada of French, Basque descent.
 Earl Long (1895–1960), three-time Democratic governor of Louisiana
 Huey Long (1893–1935), Louisiana Governor and a U.S. senator
 Alexander Mouton (1804–1885), United States Senator and Governor of Louisiana
 Thomas Nelson Jr. (1738–1789), signer of the Declaration of Independence, Governor of Virginia
 Pierre S. du Pont, IV, Governor of Delaware, U.S. Representative
 Aram J. Pothier, twice Governor of Rhode Island; of French Canadian descent
 Andre B. Roman (1795–1866), speaker of the Louisiana House of Representatives and twice elected Governor of Louisiana
 Franklin D. Roosevelt, 32nd president of the United States
 John Sevier, Governor of Tennessee until his death; house representative
 Henry S. Thibodaux (1769–1827), Governor of Louisiana; father-in-law of Alexander Hamilton
 Jacques Villeré (1761–1830), second governor of Louisiana
 George Washington (1732–1799), general of the American Revolutionary War, first American President, descendant of French-American Nicolas Martiau

Congressmen and senators

 Les AuCoin, former Democratic congressman from Oregon
 Kelly Ayotte (born 1968), New Hampshire former U.S. Senator 
 Joe Biden, U.S. Senator and 46th President of the United States. 
Carolyn Bourdeaux (born 1970) Democratic member of the United States House of Representatives from Georgia
 Elias Boudinot (1740–1821), early American statesman
 James Carville, French-American (Cajun) from Louisiana; outspoken Democrat and served in the Clinton administration; has been a political commentator for many years
 Hillary Clinton (born 1947), United States Secretary of State, former Democratic member of the United States Senate from New York; wife of William Jefferson Clinton; former first lady of the US
 Davy Crockett (1786–1836), folk hero, frontiersman, soldier and Congressman from Tennessee
 Tom DeLay (born 1947), former Republican member of the United States House of Representatives from Sugar Land, Texas, the former House Majority Leader, prominent member of the Republican Party
 Mike Gravel (1930–2021), Alaska former U.S. senator and candidate for the 2008 Democratic presidential nomination
 F. Edward Hebert, former Congressman, Chairman of Armed Services Committee
 Hiram Johnson, Governor of California, Congressman and U.S. Senator. 
 Philip La Follette, Governor of Wisconsin two separate terms
 Robert M. La Follette, Sr. (1855–1925), politician who served as a U.S. Congressman, the 20th Governor of Wisconsin from 1901 to 1906, and Senator from Wisconsin from 1905 to 1925 as a member of the Republican Party
 John Baptiste Charles Lucas, member of the U.S. House of Representatives from Pennsylvania
 Bernard de Marigny, early President of the Louisiana Senate
 Michael Michaud (born 1955), Democratic member of the U.S. House of Representatives from Millinocket, Maine, first elected in 2002
 Wilmer Mizell (1930–1999), Republican member of the U.S. House of Representatives for North Carolina, 1969–1975
 Lisa Murkowski (born 1957), Republican member of the U.S. Senate for Alaska, 2002- (her mother was of French-Irish descent)
 Gary Peters, junior Senator from Michigan (his mother was from France)
 Julien de Lallande Poydras (1740–1824), represented the Territory of Orleans in the U.S. House of Representatives, 1809–1811; a self-made businessman, philanthropist, poet, and educator
 Daniel Roberdeau (1727–1795), represented Pennsylvania from 1777 to 1779 in the Continental Congress and served as a brigadier general in the state militia during the Revolutionary War
 Joseph Rosier, Senator
 John Sevier (1745–1815), served four years as the only governor of the State of Franklin and twelve years as governor of Tennessee, and as a US Representative from Tennessee from 1811 until his death

Mayors
 Prudent Beaudry, mayor of Los Angeles
 Paul Bertus, mayor of New Orleans
 Etienne de Boré, first Mayor of New Orleans
 Paul Capdevielle, Confederate army officer, then mayor of New Orleans
 Joey Durel, mayor of Lafayette, Louisiana
 Barry E. DuVal, mayor of Newport News, Virginia, 1990
 Peter Force (1790–1868), mayor of Washington, D.C., and archivist
 William Freret, thirteenth mayor of New Orleans
 Charles Genois (1793–1866), mayor of New Orleans
 Nicholas Girod, mayor of New Orleans
 John Brennan Hussey, former mayor of Shreveport, Louisiana
 Moon Landrieu, judge, former mayor of New Orleans, and former United States Secretary of Housing and Urban Development
 Damien Marchessault, mayor of Los Angeles
 Joseph Edgard Montegut, mayor of New Orleans
 James Pitot, second mayor of New Orleans
 Louis Philippe de Roffignac, mayor of New Orleans
 Jacques Roy, former mayor of Alexandria, Louisiana
 J. A. D. Rozier, mayor of New Orleans
 Charles Trudeau, fifth mayor of New Orleans
 Joanne Verger, mayor of Coos Bay, serving four terms; served in the Oregon House of Representatives from 2001 to 2004; elected to the Oregon State Senate in 2004

Other politicians

 Amy Coney Barrett, judge
 P. G. T. Beauregard, civil servant, politician, inventor, author, and the first prominent general for the Confederate States Army during the American Civil War
 Jonathan Blanchard, lawyer, statesman; delegate for New Hampshire to the Continental Congress in 1784
 Charles Joseph Bonaparte, Secretary of the Navy (1905) and US Attorney General (1906) in the Theodore Roosevelt Administration; founder of the Bureau of Investigation in 1908, renamed in 1935 the Federal Bureau of Investigation
 Merle Boucher, North Dakota House of Representatives, representing the 9th district since 1991
 Richard Boucher, Assistant Secretary of State for South and Central Asian Affairs
 James Carville, political consultant
 Todd Chretien, activist
 Eugene Debs, union organizer
 F.O. "Potch" Didier, Louisiana sheriff
 Cat Doucet, Louisiana sheriff
 George H. Durand, politician, jurist, and attorney
 Henry Durant, first President of the University of California
 Henry Fowle Durant, founder of Wellesley College
 Michael Raoul Duval, investment banker and lawyer; had Senior White House positions while serving under presidents Richard Nixon and Gerald Ford, where he rose to the position of Special Counsel to the President
 Christopher Emery (born 1957), author, Chief Enterprise Architect, and former White House Assistant Chief Usher
 Pierre (Peter) Charles L'Enfant, architect and urban planner
 John C. Frémont, military officer, explorer and the first candidate of the Republican Party for the office of President of the United States
 Edmond-Charles Genêt, French Ambassador to the U.S. during the American Revolution
 John Lewis Gervais, American statesman from South Carolina; delegate to the Continental Congress from 1782 to 1783
 Izabel Goulart (born 1984), Brazilian model of French and Italian ancestry; Victoria's Secret Angel
 John Grenier, one of the figures responsible for the rise of the Republican Party in Alabama
 Alexander Hamilton (1755–1804), American founding father, army officer, lawyer, politician, leading statesman, financier, and political theorist
 Russel L. Honoré, retired Lieutenant General who served as the 33rd commanding general of the U.S. First Army
 Caroline Kennedy (born 1957), daughter of Jacqueline Kennedy Onassis and John F. Kennedy
 John F. Kennedy, Jr. (1960–1999), son of Jacqueline Kennedy Onassis and U.S. President John F. Kennedy
Jacques Paul Klein, Under-Secretary-General United Nations, Ambassador, Major General, USAF 
 Eric LaFleur, Louisiana House of Representatives
 Raymond "Lala" Lalonde, former Democratic Louisiana state representative
 Lyndon LaRouche, American political figure
 Dudley J. LeBlanc, popular member of Democratic Party
 Edwin O. LeGrand, one of the fifty-seven men who signed the Texas Declaration of Independence
 William Lenoir, American Revolutionary War officer and prominent statesman
 Nathaniel Macon, spokesman for the Old Republican faction of the Democratic-Republican Party
 Robert B. Macon, representative
 Alexander McGillivray, leader of the Creek Indians
 Ernest Nathan Morial, American political, legal, and civil rights leader
 Libby Pataki, former First Lady of New York
 Joel Roberts Poinsett, physician, botanist and American statesman
 Pierre S. du Pont, IV, member of the Republican Party; served three terms as U. S. Representative from Delaware and two terms as Governor of Delaware
 Hope Portocarrero (1929–1991), former First Lady of Nicaragua
 Julien de Lallande Poydras (1740–1824), French-American politician who served as Delegate from the Territory of Orleans to the United States House of Representatives
 Pierre Salinger, press secretary
 Pierre Soulé, U.S. politician and diplomat during the mid-19th century, best known for writing the Ostend Manifesto in 1854 as part of an attempt to annex Cuba to the United States
 Billy Tauzin, politician
 Joanne Verger, Mayor of Coos Bay, serving four terms; served in the Oregon House of Representatives from 2001 to 2004; elected to the Oregon State Senate in 2004
 David Vitter, politician

Authors and writers
 Laura Albert, better known under her pen-name JT LeRoy, writer and publisher
 Louis L'Amour, author
 P. G. T. Beauregard, author, civil servant, politician, inventor, and the first prominent general for the Confederate States Army during the American Civil War
 Stephen Vincent Benét (1898–1943), author, poet, short story writer and novelist
 Bryan Bergeron, author
 Edd Cartier, pulp magazine illustrator
 Kate Chopin (1851–1904), author of short stories and novels
 Robert Cormier (1925-2000), American author with French-Canadian roots
 John Dufresne, American author
 Gilbert Chinard (1881–1972), author, historian
 Will Durant (1885–1981), philosopher, historian, and writer
 John Crittenden Duval, author
 Kelly Le Fave (born 1959), poet
 Richard Le Gallienne, man of letters
 Robert Grenier, contemporary American poet who is often associated with the Language School
 Jack Kerouac (1922–1969), novelist, writer, poet, artist, and part of the Beat Generation
 Theodore de Laguna, American philosopher; early feminist
 Sidney Lanier (1842–1881), musician and poet
 Steve Lavigne, comic book illustrator best known for his lettering and coloring on  Teenage Mutant Ninja Turtles comics
 Jonathan Littell, French-American author
 Grace Metalious (1924–1964), author, best known for Peyton Place
 Alice Miel, author
 Anaïs Nin (1903–1977), known for published diaries
 William Pène du Bois, author, illustrator and publicist
 Pierre Samuel du Pont de Nemours (1739–1817), writer, economist and statesman
 Annie Proulx
 Paul Theroux
 Henry David Thoreau (1817–1862), author of many articles and essays, development critic, naturalist, transcendentalist, pacifist, tax resister and philosopher; known for Walden, Civil Disobedience, Resistance to Civil Government
 George Steiner, born in Paris to Austrian-Jewish parents before moving to the US
 Gerald Vizenor (born 1934), poet, novelist and literary theorist;t known as an Anishinaabe writer, but he has written extensively about his French ancestors in texts such as Wordarrows (the narrative persona, "Clement Beaulieu", was the name of his uncle)
 Marguerite Yourcenar, author and first woman to be elected to the Académie Française, in 1980

Education

 Jonathan Blanchard, pastor, educator, social reformer, abolitionist and the first president of Wheaton College
 Richard Grenier, neoconservative cultural columnist for The Washington Times; film critic for Commentary and The New York Times
 Vladimir Lefebvre, mathematical psychologist at the University of California, Irvine
 Jean Mayer (1920–1993), French-American nutritionist; tenth president of Tufts University from 1976 to 1992
 Eric H. du Plessis, professor
 Edward Sorin (1814–1893), founder of the University of Notre Dame in Indiana and of the St. Edward's University in Texas
 Fred G. Hoffherr (d. 1956), professor Emeritus of French of Barnard College, led department
 Jeffrey Vitter (b. 1955), Frederick L. Hovde Dean of Science at Purdue University

Journalism
 Andrew Anglin, editor of The Daily Stormer
 Abbie Boudreau, CNN investigative journalist
 Jacqueline Bouvier Kennedy Onassis (1929–1994), former journalist and First Lady of the United States
 Ric Bucher, NBA analyst for ESPN
 Richard Grenier, neoconservative cultural columnist for The Washington Times; film critic for Commentary and The New York Times
Ellen DeGeneres, television host & tv producer
 Adrian Nicole LeBlanc, journalist
 Connie LeGrand, television journalist; served in broadcasting in South Carolina; host of Speed News (now The Speed Report)
 John R. MacArthur, reporter for The Wall Street Journal (1977), the Washington Star (1978), The Bergen Record (1978–1979), Chicago Sun-Times (1979–1982); assistant foreign editor at United Press International (1982)
 Suzanne Malveaux, CNN correspondent, of French Creole ancestry
 E. Annie Proulx, American journalist and author
 Pierre Salinger (1925–2004), news correspondent and presidential press secretary for John F. Kennedy

Military

 Augustin de La Balme, General of Cavalry during the American Revolution
 John Bayard, Colonel in the Continental Army
 George Dashiell Bayard, grandson of John Bayard brigadier general in the Union Army
 P. G. T. Beauregard, general for the Confederate Army during the American Civil War, writer, civil servant and inventor
 Frank Besson, U.S. General
 Albert Gallatin Blanchard, Civil War General in the Confederate Army
 Joseph Blanchard, Lieutenant during the French-Indian War
 Jerome Napoleon Bonaparte II, serving in American and French Armies.
 Benjamin Bonneville, French-born officer in the United States Army, fur trapper, and explorer in the American West
 Mitch Bouyer (1837–1876), interpreter/guide in the Old West following the American Civil War, killed at the Battle of the Little Bighorn on June 25, 1876
 Claire Lee Chennault, World War II aviator and founder of the Flying Tigers
 Godfrey Chevalier, pioneer of the naval aviation.
 Davy Crockett, American folk hero, frontiersman, soldier, and politician. The earliest known paternal ancestor was Gabriel Gustave de Crocketagne, whose son Antoine de Saussure Peronette de Crocketagne was given a commission in the Household Troops under French King Louis XIV. 
 Claudius Crozet, French-born educator and civil engineer
 Stephen Decatur (1779–1820), naval officer notable for his heroism in actions at Tripoli, Libya in the Barbary Wars and in the War of 1812
 Xavier Debray, French-born officer who served as Brigadier General in the Confederate Army
 Wilmot Gibbes de Saussure, Brigadier General in the Confederate Army
 Lewis DuBois, American Revolutionary War commander
 Dudley M. DuBose, Brigadier General in the Confederate Army
 Michael Durant, Army pilot officer
 William G. Fournier, Army soldier and a recipient of the military's highest decoration—the Medal of Honor—for his actions in World War II.
 Rene Gagnon (1925–1979), one of the U.S. Marines immortalized in the famous World War II photograph (by Joe Rosenthal) of the raising of the flag on Iwo Jima
 Victor Girardey, French-born immigrant who served as brigadier General in the Confederate States Army
 Richard Grenier, lieutenant in the Naval Academy
 Robert Grenier, longtime CIA officer who served as the CIA's top counter-terrorism official in 2005
 Florent Groberg, Medal of Honor recipient. Born in France to French mother and American father
 Louis Hébert, Brigadier General in the Confederate Army
 Paul Octave Hébert, cousin of Louis Hébert, Governor of Louisiana and Brigadier General in the Confederate Army.
 Jean Joseph Amable Humbert, figure in New France's military who settled in New Orleans in 1808
 Papa Jack Laine, bandleader
 Leon J. LaPorte, four-star general
 Robert E. Lee (1807–1870), General of the Confederate Army during the American Civil War 1861–1865, a descendant of military engineer Nicolas Martiau
 John A. Lejeune, U.S. Marine Corps lieutenant general and the 13th Commandant of the Marine Corps. Nicknamed  "the greatest of all Leathernecks".
 Curtis Emerson LeMay (1906–1990), Chief of Staff of the U.S. Air Force from 1961 to 1965.  
 William Lenoir, American Revolutionary War officer and prominent statesman in late 18th-century and early 19th-century North Carolina
 Robert C. Macon, Army General during World War II; commanded the 83rd Infantry Division during the drive across Europe and served as military attaché in Moscow
 Arthur Middleton Manigault, Brigadier General in the Confederate Army
 Francis Marion (1732–1795), Brigadier General during American Revolutionary War; known as "Swamp Fox"; one of the fathers of modern guerrilla warfare
 Nicolas Martiau (1591–1657), military engineer of Jamestown, Virginia 1620, ancestor of President George Washington
 Dabney H. Maury, Major General in the Confederate Army
 Benjamin McCulloch (1811–1862), Texas Ranger, military officer, California 49er, sheriff, U.S. Marshall, U.S. Peace Commissioner ending the Utah War of 1857–58, a descendant of Nicolas Martiau
 Henry Eustace McCulloch (1816–1895), Texas Ranger, military officer in the Texas Revolution as well as the Mexican-American War and the American Civil War, a descendant of Nicolas Martiau
 Gilbert du Motier, Marquis de La Fayette (1757–1834), aristocrat, considered a national hero in both France and the United States for his participation in the French and American revolutions, for which he became an honorary citizen of the United States
 Alfred Mouton, Confederate general in the American Civil War
 Prince Achille Murat, former colonel who settled in New France
 Thomas Nelson Jr. (1738–1789), Brigadier General, Signer of the Declaration of Independence, Governor of Virginia, descendant of Nicolas Martiau
 Abner Monroe Perrin, Brigadier General in the Confederate Army
 John Joseph Pershing (1860–1948), General of the Armies – commander of the American Expeditionary Forces (AEF) on the Western Front in World War I, 1917–18. Pershing's great-great-grandfather, Frederick Pershing, whose name originally was Pfoerschin, emigrated from Alsace in 1749 
 Camille Armand Jules Marie, Prince de Polignac, French officer who served as Major General in the Confederate Army
 Stephen Rochefontaine, Chief of Engineers of the Continental Army
 Frederick Rosier, Royal Air Force commander
 Gilbert Moxley Sorrel, Brigadier General in the Confederate Army
 Pierre Sprey (1937-2021), defense analyst and member of Fighter Mafia group
 John Bordenave Villepigue (1830-1862), Brigadier General in the confederate Army
 Lewis Warrington (1782-1851), captain in the US Navy, distinguished in the Barbary Wars illegitimitate son of Donatien-Marie-Joseph_de_Vimeur,_vicomte_de_Rochambeau

Religion
 Antoine Blanc, fourth Bishop and first Archbishop of the Roman Catholic Archdiocese of New Orleans
 Roy Bourgeois, American priest in the Maryknoll order of the Roman Catholic Church and founder of the human rights group SOA Watch
 Charles J. Chaput, 9th and current Archbishop of Philadelphia
 Anton Docher (1852–1928), The Padre of Isleta and Indians protector, New Mexico
 Claude Marie Dubuis, second Roman Catholic bishop of Texas
 Peter L'Huillier, retired archbishop of the Orthodox Church in America's Diocese of New York and New Jersey
 Jean-Baptiste Lamy (1814–1888), first Archbishop of the Roman Catholic Archdiocese of Santa Fe, New Mexico
 Mathias Loras (1792–1858), priest who later became the first Bishop of the Dubuque Diocese in what would become the state of Iowa
 Tammy Faye Messner
 Michael Portier (1795–1859), Roman Catholic bishop and the first Bishop of Mobile

Science
 Felicie Albert, French-born American physicist
 Paul André Albert (1926–2019), metallurgist and technology pioneer
 John James Audubon (1785–1851), ornithologist, naturalist, and painter
 Daniel Barringer, geologist and son of Daniel Moreau Barringer, congressman
 William Beaumont, surgeon in the Army; known as the "father of gastric physiology"
 P. G. T. Beauregard, inventor, author, civil servant, politician, and the first prominent general for the Confederate States Army during the American Civil War
 Jonathan Betts-LaCroix, chief technical officer of OQO
 Thomas Blanchard, inventor, awarded over 25 patents for his creations
 Octave Chanute, railway engineer and aviation pioneer hailed as the father of aviation
 Louis Chevrolet, co-founder of the Chevrolet brand cars with William C. Durant
 Philippe Cousteau Jr., environmentalist
 Georges A. Deschamps, electrical engineer
 René Dubos (1901–1982), microbiologist, experimental pathologist, environmentalist, humanist, and Pulitzer Prize-winning author
 William C. Durant, leading pioneer of the United States automobile industry, co-founder of Chevrolet cars with Louis Chevrolet
 William F. Durand, forerunner of NASA, first civilian chair of the National Advisory Committee for Aeronautics, naval officer and pioneer mechanical engineer
 John C. Garand, inventor, gunsmith and machinist
 Karl Guthe Jansky, physicist
 Napoleon LeBrun, architect of several notable Philadelphia churches
 Pierre Charles L'Enfant (1754–1825), architect and urban planner
 William B. Lenoir, former NASA astronaut
 John Bevins Moisant (1868–1910), American aviator
 Matilde E. Moisant (1878–1964), American pioneer aviator and sister of John Bevins Moisant
 Paco Nathan, computer scientist, author, and performance art show producer
 Norbert Rilleaux, inventor, engineer
 Michel (Michael) Ter-Pogossian (1925–1996), physicist; the father of positron emission tomography
 Edward Livingston Trudeau (1848–1915), physician who established the Adirondack Cottage Sanitorium at Saranac Lake for treatment of tuberculosis
 Vincent du Vigneaud, American biochemist and Nobel Prize winner

Sports

Baseball

 Danny Ardoin (b. 1974), baseball player (catcher)
 Peter Bergeron, baseball player
 Brett Bochy, baseball pitcher
 Bruce Bochy, baseball manager
 Lou Boudreau, Hall of Fame baseball player
 Mike DeJean, baseball player
 Jim Duquette, current vice president of baseball operations for the Baltimore Orioles
 Leo Durocher, Brooklyn Dodgers player and Manager and Hall of Famer
 Andre Ethier, baseball player, French father
 Mike Fontenot (born 1980), Louisiana State University and Major League Baseball infielder
 Ray Fontenot (born 1957), former Major League pitcher
 Jeff Francoeur, baseball player
 Chad Gaudin, baseball player
 Tom Glavine, baseball pitcher
 Ron Guidry, former baseball player
 Cal Hubbard, former baseball umpire
 Nap Lajoie, Hall of Fame former second baseman in Major League Baseball
 Gene Lamont, former catcher and who managed the Chicago White Sox (1992–1995) and Pittsburgh Pirates (1997–2000)
 Jim Lefebvre, former second baseman, third baseman and manager in Major League Baseball
 Edward LeRoux, club owner
 Max Macon, Major League Baseball player and manager
 John Maine, current New York Mets pitcher
 Charlie Manuel, manager of the Philadelphia Phillies
 Rabbit Maranville, Major League Baseball Hall of Famer
 Jason Marquis, pitcher for the Chicago Cubs
 Wilmer Mizell, Major League Baseball player for the Pittsburgh Pirates and the St. Louis Cardinals
 Bill Monbouquette, baseball player, member of Red Sox Hall of Fame
 Andy Pettitte, starting pitcher for the NY Yankees
 Jerry Remy, Red Sox second baseman; later TV presenter
 Edd Roush (1893-1988), center field baseball player and Hall of Famer
 Scott Servais (b. 1967), manager of the Seattle Mariners
 Ryan Theriot (b. 1979), second baseman for the Chicago Cubs; born in Baton Rouge, Louisiana

Basketball
 Paul Arizin, former basketball player and Hall-of-Famer
 Bob Cousy, former NBA player and Hall-of-Famer
 Pat Durham, American former professional basketball
 Marcus Gaither (1961–2020), American-French basketball player
 Edwin Jackson, basketball player for Unicaja Malaga
 Zach LaVine, NBA basketball player (Minnesota Timberwolves)
 Joakim Noah, NBA basketball player (Chicago Bulls)
 Tony Parker, NBA basketball player (San Antonio Spurs)
Mickaël Piétrus, former NBA basketball player
 Robert Sacre, Canadian-American basketball player, son of Greg LaFleur
 Dominique Wilkins, NBA basketball player

Football

 George Andrie (1940-2018), player for the Dallas Cowboys
 David Bergeron (b. 1981), player, with Carolina Panthers
 Steve Broussard, former punter for the Green Bay Packers
 Steve Broussard, former NFL running back; played for Atlanta Falcons, Seattle Seahawks, and the Cincinnati Bengals
 Chris DeFrance, wide receiver for the Washington Redskins
 Joe DeLamielleure, former American football offensive lineman
 Jake Delhomme, NFL quarterback
 Greg DeLong, former NFL tight end
 Keith DeLong, former linebacker for the San Francisco 49ers
 Billy Joe DuPree, Cowboys player of French Creole descent
 Brett Favre (born 1967), NFL quarterback, descended from Jean Faure / Favre; born in Royan, Poitou-Charentes, France
 Jerry Fontenot, NFL offensive center for the Bears, Saints and Packers
 Gus Frerotte, NFL quarterback
 Mitch Frerotte (died 2008), NFL lineman; cousin of Gus Frerotte
 Mark Gastineau, former New York Jets
 Joe Germaine, NFL player, originally drafted by the St. Louis Rams in 1999
 Dorial Green-Beckham, NFL wide receiver, Tennessee Titans
 Ray Guy, former punter for the Oakland Raiders
 Bobby Hebert, former NFL quarterback
 Brock Huard, Seattle Seahawks former quarterback
 Damon Huard, former quarterback for the Kansas City Chiefs, New England Patriots, Miami Dolphins, Cincinnati Bengals, and San Francisco 49ers
 Dick Jauron, Buffalo Bills head coach
 Charlie Joiner, San Diego Chargers player
 David LaFleur, player in heart of Dallas Cowboys
 Greg LaFleur, former player; now the athletic director at Southern University; father of Robert Sacre
 Curly Lambeau, player, coach, and founder of the Green Bay Packers
 Jack Lambert, NFL Hall of Famer and one of the Steelers' greatest players
 Greg Landry, former Detroit Lions quarterback
 Tom Landry, coach, Dallas Cowboys
 Steve Largent, NFL Hall of Famer
 Chad Lavalais, NFL player
 Dick LeBeau, Pittsburgh Steelers defensive coordinator; former football player
 Roger LeClerc, former player for the Denver Broncos and Chicago Bears
 Stefan LeFors, football quarterback
 Frank LeMaster, former linebacker for the Philadelphia Eagles
 Josh LeRibeus, guard for Washington Redskins
 Billy Lyon, former defensive tackle for the Green Bay Packers and Minnesota Vikings
 Tyrann Mathieu, Arizona Cardinals player, French Creole
 Tommy Mont, former Washington Redskins quarterback
 Luke Petitgout, NFL defender on the New York Giants team
 Noel Prefontaine, CFL kicker with the Edmonton Eskimos
 Darrell Royal, winningest football coach in University of Texas Longhorn history; College Football Hall of Fame member
 Bob St. Clair, NFL Hall of Famer; player for the 49ers
 Brian St. Pierre, quarterback originally drafted by the Pittsburgh Steelers
 Jim Thorpe (1888–1953), Hall of Fame football player; 1/2 Native American, 1/4 Irish, and 1/4 French; also a star baseball, basketball, and an Olympic star
 Mike Tolbert, player for the Carolina Panthers
 Dick Vermeil, former NFL player
 Christian Yount (b. 1988), American football long snapper for the Cleveland Browns

Hockey

 Bryan Berard, former professional ice hockey player
 Donald Brashear, former professional ice hockey player
 Thomas Bordeleau, professional ice hockey player currently playing for the San Jose Sharks
 Brian Boucher, former professional ice hockey goaltender and current analyst
 Francis Bouillon, former professional ice hockey player 
 Sean Couturier, professional ice hockey currently playing for the Philadelphia Flyers
 Johnny Gaudreau, professional ice hockey player for the Columbus Blue Jackets
 Guy Hebert, former professional ice hockey goaltender
 Pat Lafontaine, former professional ice hockey player
 John LeClair, former professional ice hockey player
 Paul Martin, hockey player
 Zach Parise, professional ice hockey player currently playing for the New York Islanders
 Philippe Sauvé, former professional ice hockey goaltender

NASCAR
 Greg Biffle, NASCAR driver
 Brett Bodine, NASCAR driver
 Geoff Bodine, NASCAR driver
 Todd Bodine, NASCAR driver
 Bill France, Sr. (1909–1992), co-founder of NASCAR
 Bobby Labonte, NASCAR driver and brother of Terry Labonte
 Terry Labonte, NASCAR driver and brother of Bobby Labonte
 Corey LaJoie, NASCAR driver and son of Randy LaJoie
 Randy LaJoie, NASCAR driver and father of Corey LaJoie
 Jack Roush, NASCAR team owner

Rodeo
 Earl W. Bascom (1906–1995), rodeo pioneer, rodeo champion, rodeo hall of fame inductee, "father of modern rodeo"

Soccer
 Davy Arnaud (b. 1980), soccer coach and former player
 Roger Levesque
 Brian Maisonneuve, former soccer player
 Bert Patenaude, Hall-of-Famer and first player to score a hat-trick in a FIFA World Cup
 David Regis (born 1968), former soccer defender
 Quentin Westberg (born 1986), football (soccer) goalkeeper, playing for Troyes AC in France's Ligue 1

Tennis

 Jim Courier (born 1970), professional tennis player
 Robert LeRoy (1885-1946), professional tennis player
 Melanie Oudin, professional tennis player
 Mary Pierce, tennis player who won multiple Grand Slam titles

Other sports
 Laila Ali (born 1977), professional boxer; daughter of Muhammad Ali and his Louisiana Creole wife
 Surya Bonaly (born 1973), professional figure skater
 Walter Cartier, boxer
 Randy Couture, mixed martial arts champion
 Jean Cruguet (born 1939), thoroughbred horse racing jockey who won the United States Triple Crown of Thoroughbred Racing
 Bryson DeChambeau, professional golfer
 Eddie Delahoussaye, former quarter-horse jockey
 Kent Desormeaux, Hall of Fame jockey
 Bob Duval, professional golfer; known for being the father of David Duval, formerly the top-ranked player in the world
 David Duval, professional golfer and former World No. 1 who competes on the PGA Tour
 Eric Guerin, Hall of Fame jockey
 Hulk Hogan, professional wrestler; French on his maternal side
 Philip Lafond, professional wrestler
 Jack LaLanne, fitness, exercise and nutritional expert
 Jason Lamy-Chappuis, French Nordic combined athlete who has been competing since 2002
 Edward LeMaire, pro figure skater
 Greg LeMond, cyclist and three-time winner of the Tour de France
 Lash LeRoux, professional wrestler
 Louis Meyer (1904–1995), American Hall of Fame race car driver best known as the first three-time winner of the Indianapolis 500
 Francis Ouimet, golf player
 Allaire du Pont, American sportswoman and a member of the prominent French-American Du Pont family
 Steve Prefontaine, legendary middle and long-distance runner and first athlete to represent the Nike brand
 Nicolas Rossolimo (1910–1975), Chess Grandmaster, chess champion of France and U.S. Open champion
 Régis Sénac, fencer and instructor
 Craig Titus, IFBB professional bodybuilder
 Martin Trainer, PGA Tour golfer
 Triple H (born 1969), professional wrestler
 Benny Valger, nicknamed "The French Flash", American professional featherweight boxer who fought from the late 1910s until the 1930s

Other

Art
 Jack E. Boucher, photographer
 Xavier Fourcade, art dealer
 Steve Lavigne, American comic book illustrator best known for his lettering and coloring on Teenage Mutant Ninja Turtles comics
 Raymond Loewy, designer
 Richard Marquis, glass artist
 Daniel Wildenstein, art dealer

Cuisine
 Anthony Bourdain, author and the "Chef-at-Large" of Brasserie Les Halles
 Wylie Dufresne, chef and owner of WD~50 restaurant in Manhattan
 Nathalie Dupree, chef, cookbook author, and cooking show host
 Pierre Franey, chef
 Emeril Lagasse, celebrity chef, restaurateur, television personality, and cookbook author
 Jacques Pépin, chef
 Paul Prudhomme, chef
 Justin Wilson, chef

Miscellanea
 Frank Abagnale (born 1948), impostor
 Jérôme Napoléon Bonaparte, farmer, president of Maryland Club
 Mary Katherine Campbell (1905–1990), Miss America titleholder, 1922 and 1923; first runner-up 1924; of Cajun ancestry
 Derek Chauvin, former Minneapolis police officer convicted in the murder of George Floyd.
 Simon Favre, 18th-century interpreter of Muscogean languages; ancestor of Brett Favre
 Charles Guiteau, assassin of U.S. President James Garfield
 Alice Heine, American-born Princess of Monaco
 Jean Lafitte, sometimes spelled Laffite (c. 1780–c. 1826), Gulf of Mexico pirate, who provided critical support and expert artillery gunners to the American forces under Gen. Andrew Jackson in January 1815, at the Battle of New Orleans
 Wayne LaPierre, President of the National Rifle Association of America
 Marie Laveau, voodoo queen
 Ervil LeBaron, Mormon fundamentalist prophet; ordered the killings of many of his opponents
 Carlene LeFevre, competitive eater; wife of Rich LeFevre
 Rich LeFevre, nicknamed "The Locust"; competitive eater; husband of Carlene LeFevre
 Bugs Moran, born Adelard Cunin to Jules and Marie Diana Gobeil Cunin, French immigrants, in Saint Paul, Minnesota
 Georges de Paris, French-American tailor of the United States presidents
 Albert Simard (d. 1973), Legion of Honour, activist 
 Elmo Patrick Sonnier, convicted murderer and rapist executed
 Virginie de Ternant (1818–1887), owner and manager of Parlange Plantation

See also
 List of Cajuns
 List of Louisiana Creoles

Notes

References

French Americans
Americans
French